Agassiceras is a Lower Jurassic ammonite from the Sinemurian stage in Europe. Agassiceras belongs to the psiloceratacean family, Arietitidae, and is characterized by being compressed with a sharp venter and feeble straight ribs that may bifurcate near the umbilical edge.

References
Arkell et al., 1957. Mesozoic Ammonoidea. Treatise on Invertebrate Paleontology. Part L. Ammonoidea. Geological Society of America and Univ. of Kansas press.

Early Jurassic ammonites of Europe
Arietitidae
Ammonitida genera